Ryan McCarthy (born 21 January 1979) is a retired New Zealand rugby union footballer.

Playing career

McCarthy was a stalwart at halfback for North Otago in the early 2000s, earning 51 caps for the province and helping them to a Division 3 championship in 2002. After a stellar 2005 season in Division 2 during which he scored 6 tries and was named to the Divisional XV, he moved up to Otago for 2006, where he would struggle to get playing time behind Toby Morland and Chris Smylie.

With Smylie being drafted to the Hurricanes for the 2007 Super 14 season, McCarthy was included in the wider training group of the Highlanders as the side's 3rd halfback behind Jimmy Cowan and Morland, and was called into the squad to make a single substitute appearance during the season.

After playing club rugby in Auckland for Ponsonby Rugby Football Club in 2008, he spent a season playing for Steaua București Rugby in the Romanian Rugby Championship before retiring in 2009.

A PE teacher, McCarthy has become involved in competitive weightlifting since his retirement, winning a North Island championship in 2010.

References

1979 births
Living people
New Zealand rugby union players
North Otago rugby union players
Rugby union scrum-halves